Club Deportivo Revilla is a Spanish football team based in Revilla, Camargo, in the autonomous community of Cantabria. Founded in 1974 it currently plays in Preferente Cantabria, holding home games at Campo de Fútbol El Crucero, which has a capacity of 600 spectators.

History 

Back in the spring of 1974, the need to have a soccer team in the town of Revilla began to be managed.

After several meetings, a management directive was formalized on July 20, 1974, chaired by Luis Fernández until the end of 1974. He was replaced by Enrique Herbosa, who was president as the new director until June 30, 1979, as it had been agreed vote as president every so often.

1974/75 season: It was the beginning of the soccer team participating in Segunda Regional with local players. In the second round managed to sign a good squad of players.

1975/76 season: Promoted to Primera Regional (nowadays Regional Preferente), also youth and children's teams were formed, mostly local kids from Revilla. Also bowling and athletics teams were made in collaboration with the direction of Revilla´s School. In athletics, cross tests were organized, with great participation of athletes and spectators success.

The soccer team started playing in the Cantabrian Football Federation's fields (Adarzo, San Justo), which was a cost for the club. This made the directive assume the primary need to have a field in the town. Finally the field was inaugurate on October 2, 1977 after a lot of work being done with the collaboration of all the town of Revilla.

1994/95 season: The club promoted to Tercera División for the first time with Iván Helguera in the team.

2013/14 season: Promoted to Tercera División by winning the Preferente Cantabria category.

2014/15 season: Got the best result in its history being seventh and in this way the club participated the autonomous phase of the Spanish Royal Federation Cup the following season.

2017/18 season: Promoted to Tercera División by winning the Preferente Cantabria category for third time. 

2018-19 season: Due to the relegation of Gimnástica de Torrelavega from Segunda B to Tercera División the club was relegated to Regional Preferente.

Season to season

14 seasons in Tercera División.
 24 seasons in Regional Preferente.

Honours

Regional Preferente: 
 Winners (4): 2001–02, 2013–14, 2017-2018, 2019-2020.
 Runners-up (3): 1994-95, 2004-05, 2021-2022.

Notable former players

 Iván Helguera

References

External links
Futbolme team profile 
Arefe Regional team profile 
Team´s History 

Football clubs in Cantabria
Association football clubs established in 1974
1974 establishments in Spain